Borys Yuriyovych Derkach (14 January 1964 – May 2019) was a Soviet and Ukrainian professional football player.

From 1992 to 2005 he was in a Hungarian jail, with an original sentence of 11 years for an assault on a Hungarian pimp and two Ukrainian prostitutes. Later the sentence was increased for an escape attempt. He also played during the season 1991–92 with Bulgarian side PFC Levski Sofia, but made no appearances in the league, just one in the Bulgarian Cup.

Honours
 Soviet Top League champion: 1990.
 Soviet Cup winner: 1988, 1990.
 USSR Federation Cup finalist: 1987, 1989.
 1988–89 European Cup Winners' Cup with FC Metalist Kharkiv: 3 games.
 1990–91 European Cup Winners' Cup with FC Dynamo Kyiv: 5 games.
 1991–92 European Cup with FC Dynamo Kyiv: 1 game.

External links
 Career summary by KLISF

References

1964 births
2019 deaths
Soviet footballers
Ukrainian footballers
Ukrainian expatriate footballers
Expatriate footballers in Turkey
Expatriate footballers in Bulgaria
Expatriate footballers in Hungary
FC Metalist Kharkiv players
FC CSKA Kyiv players
PFC CSKA Moscow players
FC Dynamo Kyiv players
MFC Mykolaiv players
Bursaspor footballers
Nyíregyháza Spartacus FC players
Soviet Top League players
Süper Lig players
PFC Levski Sofia players
Association football defenders